"Love a Little Stronger" is a song written by Chuck Jones, Billy Crittenden and Gregory Swint, and recorded by American country music group Diamond Rio. It was released in May 1994 as the first single and title track and from their album Love a Little Stronger.

Content
"Love a Little Stronger" was written by Chuck Jones, Gregory Swint and Billy Crittenden, who was a member of the band 4 Runner at the time. In it, the male narrator promises that he will try harder to save a flagging relationship.

Critical reception
Deborah Evans Price, of Billboard magazine reviewed the song favorably, saying that Jimmy Olander's "wonderful, Tele-bending guitar work and the band's road-tightened harmonies drive this cool single home."

Music video
The music video for "Love a Little Stronger" was made by Deaton-Flanigen Productions.

Chart performance
The song peaked at number 2 on The Billboard country charts, behind "Be My Baby Tonight" by John Michael Montgomery and "Dreaming With My Eyes Open" by Clay Walker and number 6 on Canada's RPM country chart.

Year-end charts

References

1994 singles
1994 songs
Diamond Rio songs
Songs written by Chuck Jones (songwriter)
Music videos directed by Deaton-Flanigen Productions
Arista Nashville singles